MTV Love School is an Indian youth based reality show which premiered on 5 December 2015 on MTV India.

The first season was hosted by Upen Patel and Karishma Tanna but the next seasons were hosted by Karan Kundra and Anusha Dandekar. The series focuses on relationships of real life-couples.

Series

Season 1
Winners: Tushar and Karishma
Runners-up: Kabir and Pooja
3rd place: Malkit and Gurpreet (Maddy and Silky)

Contestants

Season 2
Winners: Pasha Doll and Khemraj Bhardwaj
Runners-up: Bhavya and Rasika
3rd place: Honey and Ashiya

Contestants

Season 3
Winners : Divya and Lalit Runners-up :Sakshi and Aviral3rd place : Aditi and Ujjwal

Couples

Singles

 Indicates the contestant is male.
 Indicates the contestant is female.

Wild-cards

 Indicates the contestant is male.
 Indicates the contestant is female.

Summary

 The contestant won the Love Exam.
 The contestant won the Assignment.
 The contestant was Safe.
 The contestant was saved by Karan & Anusha.
 Indicates the contestant was not in the competition.
 Indicates the contestant wild card entry in the competition.
 The contestant was in the bottom.
 The contestant was Voted-out.
 The contestant quit the competition.
 The contestant was originally eliminated but was saved.
 The contestant was originally saved but had to leave due to no partner.
 The contestant was Winner of the MTV Love School Season 3.

Voting History

 These contestants won a special Advantage in the Judgement Night.
 Indicates the contestant was not in the competition.
 Indicates the contestant wild card entry in the competition.
 The contestant was in the bottom.
 The contestant was Voted-out.
 The contestant quit the competition.
 The contestant was originally eliminated but was saved.
 The contestant was originally saved but had to leave due to no partner.
  The contestant won MTV Love School Season 3.
 The contestant was the runner-up.

Notes
: This season Karan & Anusha had the power to not to eliminate a couple but to save a couple in the bottom. And the contestants had the power to vote-out one boy & one girl in the bottom.
: In week 1, Karan & Anusha saved Ankit & Daizy.
: In week 2, Karan & Anusha saved Aviral & Christeena.
: In this week, Nisha was the girl with higher votes to eliminate than Payal, but Payal decided to quit with Akash. Therefore, Nisha was brought back in the game. 
: Aviral & Sakshi had the power to swap 1 of the couples in the danger with 1 of the safe couples. They chose Mohit & Nisha to swap with Laxya & Deepali.
: In week 3, Karan & Anusha saved Laxya & Deepali.
: As it was tie between Daizy and Gergana. Contestants had to vote again to vote-out 1 of the girls.
: As Ankit was eliminated, Daizy decided to quit with Ankit. 
: Laxya, Deepali & Pratik had a special power to nullify one of the other contestant's vote. Laxya chose Christeena, Deepali chose Aviral & Pratik chose Aditi.
: In week 4, as it was tie between Lalit and Nitin, Karan & Anusha decided to eliminate Nitin.
: In week 5, Karan & Anusha saved Laxya & Deepali.
: Lalit & Divya had a special power to eliminate one from Christeena and Kushi. They chose Christeena.
: There was no elimination this week. Therefore, Pratik & Christeena were safe.
: In week 6, Karan & Anusha saved Lalit & Divya.
: Actually, Madhav & Vishakha were eliminated, but Nishank & Mansi quit the show due to Mansi's grandmother health problem.
: Lalit & Divya had a super power to send one of the save couples into the danger zone. They chose Mohit & Sakshi. 
: This week contestants voted to eliminate but the Twist was the voting was to save. Therefore, Ujjwal & Sakshi were save and Aviral, Christeena, Mhit & Aditi were in the bottom 2. Then Karan & Anusha had the power to eliminate one couple. They chose Aviral & Christeena.
: In week, Karan & Anusha saved Mohit & Sakshi.
: This week contestants voted to eliminate but the Twist was the votes were all nullified. And only Pratik & Vishakha had the ultimate power to eliminate one couple. They chose Madhav & Kushi.
: This week Aviral & Christeena and Madhav & Kushi returned for another chance to be back in the game.

Guests
Prince Narula and Yuvika Chaudhary

Season 4

Couples

Singles

 Indicates the contestant is male.
 Indicates the contestant is female.

Wild-cards

 Indicates the contestant is male.
 Indicates the contestant is female.

Summary

 The contestant won the Love Exam.
 The contestant won the Assignment.
 The contestant was Safe.
 The contestant was saved by Power Couple/Karan & Anusha.
 Indicates the contestant was not in the competition.
 Indicates the contestant Re-entry in the competition.
 Indicates the wild card contestant won the Special Wild card/Re-entry competition.
 Indicates the wild card contestant lost the Special Wild card/Re-entry competition.
 The contestant was in the bottom.
 The contestant was Voted-out.
 The contestant quit the competition.
 The contestant was originally eliminated but was saved.
 The contestant had to leave due to family issues.
 The contestant was originally saved but had to leave due to no partner.
  The contestant won MTV Love School Season 3.
 The contestant was the runner-up.
 The contestants were eliminated during the semi-final.

Voting History

 These contestants won a special Advantage in the Judgement Night.
 Indicates the contestant was not in the competition.
 Indicates the contestant re-entered the competition.
 The contestant was in the bottom.
 The contestant was Voted-out.
 The contestant quit the competition.
 The contestant was originally eliminated but was saved.
 The contestant had to leave due to family issues.
 The contestant was originally saved but had to leave due to no partner.
  The contestant won MTV Love School Season 4.
 The contestant was the runner-up.
 The contestants were eliminated during the semi-final.

Guests
Prince Narula and Yuvika Chaudhary in Episode 13 as Substitute Professors.

References

2015 Indian television series debuts
Hindi-language television shows
Indian reality television series
Television shows set in Mumbai
MTV (Indian TV channel) original programming
2015 Indian television seasons
2017 Indian television seasons
2018 Indian television seasons
Dating and relationship reality television series